Challenger is the third studio album by American metalcore band Memphis May Fire. The album was released June 26, 2012 via Rise Records. The band released the first single, "Prove Me Right," on May 24. They also released the 5th track on the album, "Vices," on  June 13 as the second single from the album. On June 18, all of the songs were uploaded to YouTube on the Rise Records page.
The album debuted at number 16 on the Billboard 200, selling more than 18,000 copies in its first week.

It is the first album to have rhythm guitarist Anthony Sepe who replaced original member Ryan Bentley following his departure in April 2011.

Track listing
All lyrics written by Matty Mullins, all music composed by Kellen McGregor and Memphis May Fire.

Personnel
 Matty Mullins – lead vocals, keyboards
 Kellen McGregor – lead guitar
 Anthony Sepe - rhythm guitar
 Cory Elder – bass guitar
 Jake Garland – drums

References

2012 albums
Memphis May Fire albums
Rise Records albums